WTBG (95.3 FM, "95.3 Brownsville Radio") is a radio station broadcasting a News Talk Information format. Licensed to Brownsville, Tennessee, United States, the station is currently owned by Wireless Group, Inc. and features programming from Cumulus Media Networks.

References

External links
 

TBG
News and talk radio stations in the United States
Haywood County, Tennessee
Radio stations established in 1970
1970 establishments in Tennessee